Shobha Somnath Ki is an Indian historical television drama series on Zee TV based on Acharya Chatursen's 1954 Hindi novel Somnath Mahalay. It tells the story of a fictional  young female called Shobha amid the infamous raids in western India by Sultan Maḥmūd of Ghazni in the early 11th century.

The show replaced another historical drama Jhansi Ki Rani on Zee TV. Initially, the drama was produced by Contiloe Entertainment. However, due to Veer Shivaji on Colors TV and Mahabharat (2013 TV series) on Star Plus, Contiloe Telefilms handed over the reins to Swastik Pictures. The show was shown every day for some months, and was changed to being broadcast bi-weekly due to decreased popularity. Another show Hitler Didi replaced the time slot when Shobha Somnath Ki was shown (starting 7 November 2011). On 12 November 2011, the broadcast time was changed to weekends only. It aired its last episode on 26 February 2012.

Cast

 Vikramjeet Virk as Mahmud of Ghazni
 Srishty Rode as Princess Shobha
 Ashnoor Kaur as Young Princess Shobha
 Tarun Khanna / Yash Tonk as Dadda Chalukya
 Preeti Puri / Amrita Raichand as Gayatri Devi
 Jignesh Mehta  as Prince Bheemdev
 Azaan Ali Khan as Young Prince Bheemdev
Priyanka Chhabra as Princess Chaula
Navina Bole as Kausar Jahan
Pankaj Dheer as Kirit Chalukya
Reshmi Ghosh as Indumati
Saadhika Randhawa as Indumati
Avinash Wadhavan as Patan Samrat Vallabhev
 Seema Pandey / Roma Bali as Vijaylaxmi
Vaquar Shaikh as Puru
 Siddharth Vasudev as Bhaanuman
Kali Prasad Mukherjee / Sadashiv Amrapurkar as Mahant Rudhrabhadra
Sudhanshu Pandey as Chandradev
Shraddha Musale as Bhairavi
 Sonica Handa
Aarun Nagar as Mantri
Ahsaas Channa as Loma
 Kannan Arunachalam as Rudrabhadra

Awards

ITA Awards

 2011: Best Lyricist – Devendra Qafir
 2011: Best Editing – Paresh Shah
 2011: Best Costumes – Nidhi Yasha

Zee Rishtey Awards

 2011: Favourite Khalnayak – Vikramjeet Virk

References

External links
 
 Shobha Somnath Ki: On the sets

Zee TV original programming
Indian television soap operas
2011 Indian television series debuts
2012 Indian television series endings
Indian period television series
Television shows based on Indian novels
Indian historical television series
Television shows set in Gujarat
Television series set in the 11th century
Swastik Productions television series